Karl Neubauer (10 October 1896 – 13 December 1954) was an Austrian footballer. He played in seven matches for the Austria national football team from 1919 to 1921.

References

External links
 

1896 births
1954 deaths
Austrian footballers
Austria international footballers
Association footballers not categorized by position